Christopher Ride (born 1965 in Canberra, Australia) is a science fiction and thriller writer. He lives in Melbourne, Australia. He is also managing director of Interactive, an IT service provider, and has won the 2011 Southern Region Ernst & Young Entrepreneur of the Year for Technology award.

Early life
At age 20 Ride had lived in seven countries including Burma, Peru, Turkey, Canada and the United States, witnessed three military coups, a category 5 hurricane, a 7.75 Richter scale earthquake and lived in Tanzania during the war against Idi Amin.

Career
Managing Director of Interactive Pty Ltd, 1999–2017, Australia's largest privately owned IT company. Ride led the organisation to 18 years of successive growth. Ride remained a Director at Interactive until 2019. In 2019 he founded Auskelp Pty Ltd. Auskelp's mission is to build Australia's first large-scale kelp enterprise. A new-age industry for a rapidly changing world.

Writing
Ride self-published his first novel, The Schumann Frequency, in 2007. He was signed by Random House Australia (who re-released The Schumann Frequency in 2009) thereafter to a multiple-book deal for his Overseer Series. The second book in the series The First Boxer was released in 2009 (Later renamed "The last Empress" in 2012) and a third installment The Inca Curse followed in 2012.

Bibliography

The Overseer Series
 The Schumann Frequency (2007) | 
 The Last Empress (previously titled The First Boxer) (2009) | 
 The Inca Curse (2012) |

External links
 Random House Australia - Authors

References

1965 births
Living people
Australian science fiction writers
Australian thriller writers
Australian male novelists